Three Lakes Municipal Airport,  is a town owned public use airport located 3 miles (5 km) southeast of the central business district of Three Lakes, Wisconsin, a town in Oneida County, Wisconsin, United States.

Although most airports in the United States use the same three-letter location identifier for the FAA and International Air Transport Association (IATA), this airport is assigned 40D by the FAA but has no designation from the IATA.

Facilities and aircraft 
It has one runway: 3/21 is 3,400 by 120 feet (1,036 x 37 m) with a turf surface.

For the 12-month period ending August 12, 2021, the airport had 4,750 aircraft operations, an average of 13 per day; all general aviation. In January 2023, there were 8 aircraft based at this airport:  6 single-engine, 1 multi-engine and 1 ultralight.

See also
 List of airports in Wisconsin

References

External links 
 Airport page from Town of Three Lakes website

Airports in Wisconsin
Buildings and structures in Oneida County, Wisconsin